Gerhard Plankensteiner (born 8 April 1971 in Sterzing, South Tyrol) is an Italian luger who competed from 1986 to 2010. Together with Oswald Haselrieder he won the bronze medal in the men's doubles event at the 2006 Winter Olympics in Turin.

Plankensteiner also won six medals at the FIL World Luge Championships with two golds (Men's doubles: 2009, Mixed team: 1989) and four bronzes (Men's doubles: 1996, Mixed team: 1991, 1996, 1997). At the FIL European Luge Championships, he won six medals with one silver (Men's doubles: 1996) and five bronzes (Men's doubles: 2002, 2008 (tied with Germany); Mixed team: 1996, 2000, 2008).

Plankensteiner's best overall Luge World Cup finish was second in men's doubles in 1996-97.

References

External links 
 
 
 

1971 births
Living people
Italian male lugers
Lugers at the 1992 Winter Olympics
Lugers at the 1998 Winter Olympics
Lugers at the 2002 Winter Olympics
Lugers at the 2006 Winter Olympics
Lugers at the 2010 Winter Olympics
Olympic lugers of Italy
Olympic bronze medalists for Italy
Olympic medalists in luge
Medalists at the 2006 Winter Olympics
Sportspeople from Sterzing
Germanophone Italian people